Jessamine is an unincorporated community located in Jessamine County, Kentucky, United States. Its post office is no longer in service.

References

Unincorporated communities in Jessamine County, Kentucky
Unincorporated communities in Kentucky